

Spruce Hill is a neighborhood in the University City section of West Philadelphia. With a population of over 16,000, it is a racially and ethnically diverse part of the city where much historic architecture is preserved. The neighborhood contains a large number of Victorian rowhouses, many of which have been converted to multi-family apartments.

It was built as a streetcar suburb for Center City between 1850 and 1910. Among its most prominent developers was financier Clarence Howard Clark Sr. (1833 – 1906), who built dozens of rowhouses,  donated land for the Walnut Street West Branch of the Free Library of Philadelphia, settled a tax assessment by founding the 9.1-acre Clark Park, and established his mansion on the grassy block that today holds the Penn Alexander public elementary school.

A statue of Charles Dickens, cast in 1890 by Francis Edwin Elwell, stands in Clark Park; it is one of just two known statues of the author.

Education

The School District of Philadelphia operates Penn Alexander School and the Paul Robeson High School for Human Services. The Spruce Hill Christian elementary and middle school is on Baltimore Avenue. The University of Pennsylvania campus extends into Spruce Hill and the University of the Sciences campus is also in the neighborhood.

Public libraries

The Free Library of Philadelphia Walnut Street West Branch serves Spruce Hill.

See also

 Saint Mary's Church, Hamilton Village

References

External links

 Spruce Hill Historic District
 Spruce Hill Community Association
 West Philadelphia Data and Information Resources - University of Pennsylvania

 
Neighborhoods in Philadelphia
Streetcar suburbs